The Transitional National Government (TNG) was the internationally recognized central government of Somalia from 2000 to 2004.

Overview
The TNG was established in April–May 2000 at the Somalia National Peace Conference held in Arta, Djibouti. It was militarily and politically opposed by the Somalia Reconciliation and Restoration Council, which was formed by faction leaders including Hussein Mohamed Farrah Aidid and Mohamed Dhere.

In principle, the Transitional National Charter, which gave rise to the TNG, recognized de facto regional autonomy and the existence of new entities in the north of the former Somalia, home to relatively homogenous clans. In some parts of Somalia, however, decentralization meant state authority disintegrated.

According to Le Sage, the TNG in 2002 had all of the organs of a national government, including executive and judicial structures as well as a parliament, a police force and standing army. However, its institutions remained very weak on account of a dearth of basic office equipment, lack of territorial control, and inability to raise tax revenue. Due to these limitations, the TNG was unable to provide basic social services. Ministers and legislators also often expressed frustration at being shut out of the real decision-making process, and of often receiving irregular and limited salaries. As such, Le Sage argues that the public officials served more as symbols of the potential for a broad-based, national government.

The TNG's internal problems led to the replacement of the prime minister four times in three years, and the administrative body's reported bankruptcy in December 2003. Its mandate ended at the same time.

On October 10, 2004, legislators elected Abdullahi Yusuf Ahmed as the first president of the transitional federal government (TFG), the TNG's successor. He received 189 votes from the TFG Parliament, while the closest contender, erstwhile Somali ambassador to Washington Abdullahi Ahmed Addou, got 79 votes in the third round of voting. The then incumbent President of Somalia, TNG leader Abdiqasim Salad Hassan, peacefully withdrew his candidature.

History

2000
 Somalia National Peace Conference (SNPC) or Djibouti Conference, held in Arta, Djibouti, on April 20 - May 5, 2000. The name Transitional National Government (TNG) was selected for the initiative at this time.
 Election of Abdiqasim Salad Hassan as President by clan representatives

2001
 National Commission for Reconciliation and Property Settlement

2002
 2002 Somali Reconciliation Conference held in Eldoret, Kenya
 Appointment of General Ismail Qasim Naji as the leader of the army in January 2002. The army in March 2002 numbered 2,010 men and 90 women.
Mutinies in early 2002.

Leaders and members
 Abdiqasim Salad Hassan – President
 Gen. Ismail Qasim Naji – Army commander (Somali Armed Forces)
 Ali Khalif Galaydh – 1st Prime Minister, October 8, 2000 – October 28, 2001
 Osman Jama Ali – 2nd Prime Minister, briefly held post October 28–November 12, 2002
 Hassan Abshir Farah – 3rd Prime Minister, 12 November 2002–December 8, 2003
 Mohamed Abdi Yusuf – 4th Prime Minister, December 31, 2003 – November 3, 2004
 Ali Mahdi Muhammad – MP in the TNG
 Rasack Yousuf –   MP in the TNG
 Abdirahman Omar – MP in the TNG
 Mahamed Saeed – MP in the TNG

References

Political history of Somalia
2000s in Somalia
Factions in the Somali Civil War
Provisional governments
2000 establishments in Somalia
2004 disestablishments in Somalia